Jemima McCalman is an Australian rugby union player.

Biography 
McCalman had two pre-season training with the Waratahs but never debuted. She signed with the Brumbies for the 2022 Super W season and made her debut against the Waratahs.

McCalman made her international debut for Australia against Fiji on 6 May 2022 at the Suncorp Stadium in Brisbane. She earned her second cap for the Wallaroos against Japan on 10th May.

McCalman was later named in the Wallaroos squad for the 2022 Pacific Four Series in New Zealand. She started against the Black Ferns in the opening match of the series on 6 June. She later made her first Test start against the United States in the second round. She also started against Canada in the final round of the series, her side lost 10–22.

References 

Year of birth missing (living people)
Living people
Australia women's international rugby union players
Australian female rugby union players
21st-century Australian women